Antropovo is a rural locality (a settlement) and the administrative center of Antropovsky District of Kostroma Oblast, Russia. Population:

References

Notes

Sources

Rural localities in Kostroma Oblast
Antropovsky District
Galichsky Uyezd
Former urban-type settlements of Kostroma Oblast